The 2013–14 Croatian First Football League (officially known as the MAXtv Prva Liga for sponsorship reasons) was the 23rd season of the Croatian First Football League, the national championship for men's association football teams in Croatia, since its establishment in 1992. The season began on 13 July 2013 and ended on 17 May 2014.

The league was contested by 10 teams, down from 12 in the previous season. Dinamo Zagreb were the defending champions, having won their eighth consecutive title in 2012–13.

Teams
The following is a complete list of teams who contested the 2013–14 Prva HNL.

Stadia and locations

Personnel and kits

Managerial changes

League table

Results

First round

Second round

Relegation play-off

First leg

Second leg

Slaven Belupo won 4–3 on aggregate

Top goalscorers
As of 17 May 2014; Source: Sportnet.hr UEFA.com Prva-HNL.hr

Awards

Annual awards

References

External links
Official website 
Prva HNL at UEFA.com

2013-14
Cro
1